Thomas William Bailey (22 August 1904 – 1983) was a Welsh footballer who played as a wing half for Rochdale. He was also on the reserve team of Merthyr Town.

References

Rochdale A.F.C. players
Merthyr Town F.C. players
Footballers from Merthyr Tydfil
Welsh footballers
1904 births
1983 deaths
Association footballers not categorized by position